Charles Benjamin Pigott Roberts  was Archdeacon of Cork from 1967 until 1971.

Roberts was educated at Trinity College, Dublin and ordained in 1938.  After a curacies in Templemichael, County Cork he held incumbencies at Teampol, Carrigrohane and Shandon. He was Treasurer of Cork Cathedral from 1964 until his appointment as Archdeacon.

References

Alumni of Trinity College Dublin
Archdeacons of Cork
20th-century Irish Anglican priests